Crawfordsville is an extinct town in Preble County, in the U.S. state of Ohio.

History
Crawfordsville was laid out in 1842. It could not compete with nearby New Hope.

References

Geography of Preble County, Ohio

Ghost towns in Ohio